Awa Tsireh (February 1, 1898 – March 30, 1955), also known as Alfonso Roybal and Cattail Bird, was a San Ildefonso Pueblo painter and artist in several genres including metalwork. He was part of the art movement known as the San Ildefonso Self-Taught Group. His work is held by several museums, including the Smithsonian American Art Museum.

Early life 
Awa Tsireh was born into the San Ildefonso Pueblo. His family was very active in the arts. His parents were Alfonsita Martinez, a potter, and Juan Estaba Roybal, the nephew of potter Cresencio Martinez. His nephew José Disiderio (J.D.) Roybal also became a painter. His siblings included the artists Josefa Roybal and Santana Roybal Martinez (1909-2002).

Awa Tsireh was one of the earliest of the San Ildefonso painters. His formal education ended at grade school but he drew from his culture and informal training. Awa Tsireh was also among the students of Elizabeth Willis DeHuff, who instructed students in painting from her own home.

In 1917, American artist William Penhallow Henderson painted a portrait of young Awa Tsireh, which is now held by the New Mexico Museum of Art. Henderson's wife, Alice Corbin Henderson, was a patron of Awa Tsireh.

In 1920, Awa Tsireh married a young woman from his village. The following year she gave birth to a son, but both mother and child died soon after. Affected greatly, Awa Tsireh moved to his parents' home.

Work
Awa Tsireh had the support of Dr. Edgar Lee Hewett, who provided studio space for him in the Palace of the Governors. His art is in the permanent collection of several museums, including the Smithsonian American Art Museum.

Metalwork
It is not known when, or from whom, Awa Tsireh learned silversmithing, but by 1931 newspaper articles described him as a painter, silversmith and dancer. Around 1930 he began working in the summer months at Garden of the Gods Trading Post in Colorado Springs, Colorado and he was employed there into the 1940s. His sister, Santana Martinez, recalled that "during the summer during the thirties and forties he used to go to a shop in Colorado Springs and do paintings and silverwork there." He worked in silver, copper, nickel silver and aluminum.

Awards and honors
1931–1933 – Exposition of Indian Tribal Arts (EITA), sponsored by the College Art Association
SWAIA, Southwestern Association on Indian Affairs, Santa Fe, New Mexico
AIW, American Indian Week, Tulsa, Oklahoma
1954 – Palmes d' Academiques, from the French Government

References

External links 
• Awa Tsireh art collection, Smithsonian American Art Museum

1898 births
1955 deaths
Native American painters
20th-century American painters
American male painters
Painters from New Mexico
Artists from New Mexico
People from San Ildefonso Pueblo, New Mexico
Pueblo artists
20th-century American male artists
American silversmiths
Native American male artists
20th-century Native Americans